A coronal hole is a temporary region of relatively cool, less dense plasma in the solar corona where the Sun's magnetic field extends into interplanetary space as an open field. Compared to the corona's usual closed magnetic field that arches between regions of opposite magnetic polarity, the open magnetic field of a coronal hole allows solar wind to escape into space at a much quicker rate. This results in decreased temperature and density of the plasma at the site of a coronal hole, as well as an increased speed in the average solar wind measured in interplanetary space. If streams of high-speed solar wind from coronal holes encounter the Earth, they can cause major displays of aurorae. Near solar minimum, when activity such as coronal mass ejections is less frequent, such streams are the main cause of geomagnetic storms and associated aurorae.

History
In the 1960s, coronal holes showed up on X-ray images taken by sounding rockets and in observations at radio wavelengths by the Sydney Chris Cross radio telescope, but at the time, what they were was unclear. Their true nature was recognized in the 1970s, when X-ray telescopes in the Skylab mission were flown above the Earth's atmosphere to reveal the structure of the corona.

Solar cycle

Coronal hole size and population correspond with the solar cycle. As the Sun heads toward solar maximum, the coronal holes move closer and closer to the Sun's poles. During solar maxima, the number of coronal holes decreases until the magnetic fields on the Sun reverse. Afterwards, new coronal holes appear near the new poles. The coronal holes then increase in size and number, extending farther from the poles as the Sun moves toward a solar minimum again.

Solar wind

Coronal holes generally discharge solar wind at a speed about twice the average. The escaping solar wind is known to travel along open magnetic field lines that pass through the coronal hole area. Since coronal holes are regions in the Sun's corona that have much lower densities and temperatures than most of the corona, these regions are very thin, which contributes to the solar wind, since particles within the chromosphere can more easily break through.

Influence on space weather
During solar minima, coronal holes are the primary sources of space weather disturbances, including aurorae. Typically, geomagnetic (and proton) storms originating from coronal holes have a gradual commencement (over hours) and are not as severe as storms caused by coronal mass ejections (CMEs), which usually have a sudden onset. Because coronal holes can last for several solar rotations (i.e. several months), predicting the recurrence of this type of disturbance is often possible significantly farther in advance than for CME-related disturbances.

See also
 Heliophysics
 List of solar storms

References

Further reading
 
 Jiang, Y., Chen, H., Shen, Y., Yang, L., & Li, K. (2007, January). Hα dimming associated with the eruption of a coronal sigmoid in the quiet Sun. Solar Physics, 240(1), 77–87.

Solar phenomena